Hemalapuram (Alampuram) is a town situated in Jogulamba Gadwal district in the Indian state of Telangana. Alampur is a popular Hindu pilgrimage site in Shaktism and is also home to the Navabrahma Temples, a group of nine temples dedicated to Shiva built in the seventh and eighth century CE. It is the meeting point of the rivers Tungabhadra and Krishna and is referred to as Dakshina Kasi and is also considered the western gateway to Srisailam. The sacredness of Alampur is mentioned in the Skanda Purana. It is surrounded by the Nallamala hills and is situated on the left bank of the Tungabhadra river. Alampur was ruled by badami chalukyas they built 9 cluster of shiva temples. After them rashtrakutas of manyakheta and western chalukyas of karnataka built papanasi temples. Alampur is home to multiple Telugu and old Kannada inscriptions .Alampur contains numerous Hindu temples, the prominent ones being Jogulamba temple, Navabrahma temples, Papanasi temples, and Sangameswara Temple.

Jogulamba temple is one of the eighteen Maha Shakti Peethas, which are the most significant shrines and pilgrimage destinations in Shaktism. The Navabrahma Temples are nine temples dedicated to Shiva built in the seventh and eighth century CE by the Badami Chalukyas. The Navabrahma temples are listed as an archaeological and architectural treasure on the official "List of Monuments" prepared by the Archaeological Survey of India. Papanasi temples are a group of twenty three Hindu temples dated between 9th- and 11th-century located in Papanasi village,  to the south-west of Alampur. Papanasi temples are close to the Navabrahma Temples of the Shaivism tradition, but were constructed a few centuries later by the Rashtrakutas and Western Chalukyas.

History
Alampur was under the rule of Satavahanas, Ikshvakus of Nagarjunakonda, Badami Chalukyas, Rashtrakutas, Kalyani Chalukyas, Kakatiyas, Vijayanagara Empire, and the Qutb Shahis of Golconda. Alampur was previously known as Halampuram, Hemalapuram and Alampuram. Under the name Hatampura, it was mentioned in an inscription dated to 1101 CE in the reign of Western Chalukya king Vikramaditya VI.

Temples 
The Alampur Navabhrama Temples are historically important and reflect remarkable architectural skills. The Alampur temples are listed as an archaeological and architectural treasure on the official "List of Monuments" prepared by the Archaeological Survey of India under The Ancient Monuments and Archaeological Sites and Remains Act. Since the original area of the temples at Alampur became submerged by the Sri Sailam Hydro-electric Project, the temples were relocated to higher ground. The uniqueness of this group of temples lies in their plan and design in the northern architectural style introduced by the Chalukyas of Badami between 650 and 750 CE.

Jogulamba Temple

The Jogulamba temple is regarded as a Shakti Peetha where Sati Devi's upper teeth fell. The mythology of Daksha yagna and Sati's self immolation is the origin story of Shakti Peethas. The original temple was grounded by Muslim invaders in 1390 CE. The temple was rebuilt after 615 years.

Shakti Peethas are shrines which are the most divine seats of the Mother Goddess. The body parts of the corpse of Sati Devi had fallen in these places, when Lord Shiva carried it and wandered throughout Aryavartha in sorrow.

Navabrahma Temples 
Navabrahma Temples include nine temples dedicated to Shiva. These temples date to 7th to 8th century CE and were built by the Badami Chalukyas rulers who were patrons of art and architecture. The sacredness of Alampur Temple is mentioned in the Skanda Purana. It is mentioned that Brahma performed a strict penance here for Lord Siva. Lord Siva appeared before him and blessed him with the powers of creation. Therefore, the name Brahmeswara.

Papanasi Temples 
Papanasi temples are a group of twenty three Hindu temples dated between 9th- and 11th-century located in Papanasi village,  to the south-west of Alampur. Papanasi temples are close to the Navabrahma Temples of the Shaivism tradition, but were constructed a few centuries later by the Rashtrakutas and Western Chalukyas. The Papanasi temples exhibit the Nagara architecture with a square plan. Together with the Navabrahma temples, the Papanasi group were related to the Kalamukha and Pashupata sect of Shaivism.

Kudavelly Sangameswara Temple 
Kudavelly Sangameswara is derived from the word Sangam meaning confluence of two or more rivers. Hence the temple is also known as Kudavelly Sangameswara Temple. On the basis of a label inscription found in the temple, the temple is dated to pre-Pulakesin-II (r. 610-642 CE) time period and is the oldest of all the Chalukyan temples at Alampur. It was shifted to Alampur in 1979 when the original site got submerged due to the construction of Srisailam dam.

Archaeology Museum 
An archaeology museum is situated at the entrance of the Bala Brahma Temple complex. It houses a collection of sculptures and inscriptions recovered from the Navabrahma temples and surroundings of Alampur.

Demographics
The population in 1901 was 30,222, compared with the 27,271 in 1891. Alampur, the headquarters, had a population of 4,182. According to The Imperial Gazetteer of India, Alampur was a taluk of Raichur district, Hyderabad State.

 India census, Alampur had a population of 9350. Males constitute 54% of the population and females 46%. Alampur has an average literacy rate of 61%, higher than the national average of 59.5%; with 64% of the males and 36% of females literate. 16% of the population is under 6 years of age.

Geography 
Krishna river separates the taluk from Mahbubnagar district on the North and the Tungabhadra from Karnataka state. The confluence of these two rivers is situated in the extreme east of the taluk, formerly at Kudavelly Village. The village was submerged by construction of Srisailam dam. The well known poet Kudavelly Srinivas Rao lived in Kudavelly village and has been documented in Golkonda Kavula Sanchika Book published in 1934 by Suravaram Pratapa Reddy.

References

External links

Glory of the past - Alampur
Group of Monuments, Alampur, Andhra Pradesh

Chalukya dynasty
Shakti Peethas
Buildings on the Indian Archaeological Register
Mandals in Jogulamba Gadwal district
Jogulamba Gadwal district